The Republic of China Armed Forces (ROC Armed Forces) are the armed forces of the Republic of China (ROC). They consist of the Army, Navy (including the Marine Corps), Air Force and Military Police Force. The military is under the civilian control of the Ministry of National Defense, a cabinet-level agency overseen by the Legislative Yuan. 

Formerly known as the National Revolutionary Army before being renamed as the Republic of China Armed Forces in 1947 due to the implementation of the newly promulgated Constitution of the Republic of China. It was also historically referred as the Chinese National Armed Forces prior to the establishment of the People's Republic of China on the Chinese mainland and the gradual loss of international recognition in the 1970s by the United Nations and many countries such as the United States.

Until the 1970s and towards the end of martial law, the military's primary mission was for the ROC to eventually retake mainland China from the communist-controlled People's Republic of China (PRC) through campaigns such as Project National Glory. The military's current foremost mission is the defense of the islands remaining under the control of the ROC, against a possible military invasion by the People's Liberation Army of the PRC, which is seen as the predominant threat to the ROC in the ongoing dispute over the ambiguous political status of Taiwan dating back to the Chinese Civil War and the Surrender of Japan.

Names 
The Republic of China Armed Forces is the national military of the ROC. Commonly referred as the Taiwanese Armed Forces to distinguish from the People's Liberation Army. It is known as Kuo2-Chün1 (literally "National Army").

When the ROC was in power in mainland China, its army was the National Revolutionary Army before being renamed as the Republic of China Armed Forces in 1947 due to the implementation of the Constitution of the Republic of China. It was also historically referred as the Chinese National Armed Forces (CNAF)  prior to the establishment of the People's Republic of China. The name continued to be used internationally by a number of countries until the 1970s.

History 

The earliest use of the name "Republic of China Armed Forces (中華民國國軍)" can be found in the first Constitution of the Republic of China in the Nanjing Government in 1947.

The Republic of China's army was known as the National Revolutionary Army, which was founded on mainland China in 1925. The National Revolutionary Army was the military arm of Kuomintang (Nationalist Party - KMT) from 1925 until 1947 in the Republic of China. It also become the regular army of the ROC during the KMT's period of party rule beginning in 1928.

However, with the promulgation of the second Constitution of the Republic of China in 1947 and the formal end of the KMT party-state, the National Revolutionary Army was renamed the Republic of China Armed Forces (中華民國國軍), while the bulk of its forces formed the Republic of China Army. The army was nationalized and thus no longer belonged to the KMT. Near the end of major hostiles in the second phase of the Chinese Civil War in 1949, the ROC Armed Forces had been relocated to the island of Taiwan, previously a province under the Qing dynasty ceded to Japan in 1895 and ruled until the ROC began to administer the island in 1945 following the Surrender of Japan at the end World War II.
 
In the 21st century as the PRC vastly increased its defense spending, the Republic of China registered the lowest growth in defense spending of the major Asia-Pacific powers. These cutbacks were felt as vital land based systems were cut in order to afford an upgrade of aging fourth generation jet fighters (needed to respond to the PRC's fifth generation fighter programs). And even the jet fighter upgrades were cut back in areas such as high performance jet engines. The U.S.-China Economic and Security Review Commission found that these defense cuts could jeopardize Taiwan's military preparedness.

Army 

The Land force was established in 1924. It can be traced back to the establishment of the Whampoa Military Academy in Canton by 1911 revolutionary leader Sun Yat-sen and built as the National Revolutionary Army,  the military arm of KMT. Whampoa Military Academy was relocated to Fengshan District, Kaohsiung City, Taiwan after 1949. It was re-established as the Republic of China Military Academy (中華民國陸軍軍官學校).

Navy 

The Navy of the Qing dynasty was first exposed to Western influence. With the establishment of the Republic of China in 1912, many former Qing-naval officers agreed with the revolutionary ideal of Xinhai and joined the ROC Navy. However, with warlordism continuing to plague the territory of the Republic of China, the development of the Republican navy was somewhat slow. Furthermore, there were internal conflicts during its development. During the 2nd Sino-Japanese war, most of the ROC Navy was destroyed by the Imperial Japanese Navy. In 1946 the Republic of China Naval Academy was established in Shanghai; it was relocated to Taiwan in 1949.

Marine Corps 

The ROC Marine Corps was formed from the former Navy Sentry Corps in December 1914, it used to have two divisions, 66th and 99th divisions, in size, when its doctrine focused on retaking mainland China. Since its transition to a defensive posture, the ROCMC has been downsized from about 38,000 active personnel to only 9,000. In 2004, the ROCMC redeployed a brigade near the Taipei area to defend against a possible PLA decapitation strike. The ROC Marine Corps' official motto is "永遠忠誠" (Forever Loyalty), the Chinese translation of "Semper Fidelis".

Air Force 

In 1920 Sun Yat-sen established the Aviation Ministry in Canton (Guangdong Province). But due to the division of the Southern Warlords, it was later dismantled. In 1929, Chiang Kai-shek established the Aviation Class in the ROC Military Academy. It was relocated to Hangzhou in 1931. Following the outbreak of the 2nd Sino-Japanese War, the ROC Air Force was responsible for shooting down many Japanese Air force fighters. After 1949 the ROC Air Force Academy was relocated to Taiwan island.

Military Police 

The ROC Military Police was established in 1914 when Sun Yat-sen assumed the provisional presidency. It was established as a police guard and to maintain discipline within the army. In 1932 the nationalist government established the "Command Work of Military Police" (憲兵勤務令) and the Service Procedure for the Military Police (憲兵服務章程), which established the military police system. In 1936, the Military police Academy was founded in Nanjing. The school relocated to Taiwan after 1949.

Personnel

Conscription 

Because of the historical legacy having once controlled mainland China, the army has traditionally been the most important of the ROC's military forces, although this declined in the 1990s and early 2000s with the realization that the traditional army's role in defending against a PRC invasion is limited. As a result, recent force modernization programs have resulted in the reorganization of the Army into smaller units as a quick deployment mobile troops. For the same reason, more emphasis is being placed on the development of the Navy and Air Force, in order to fend off attacks in the Taiwan Strait, away from Taiwan proper.

The ROC Armed Forces' officer corps is generally viewed as being competent, displaying a high degree of professionalism. However, as a whole, the culture in the officer corps tends to be very cautious and conservative. The military also faces difficulties in the recruitment and retention of junior officers and NCOs due to competition with the private sector. During the 2000s, there were initial plans to turn the ROCAF into a volunteer armed forces as relations between the ROC and PRC were improving during this time.

In 2012, ROC Ministry of National Defence announced that the length of service was reduced to 4 months from the original 1 year in December 2011 for those born after 1 January 1994, due to aims to establish an all-volunteer force. As since, all able-bodied men reaching conscription age will undergo 4 month long military training instead of serving for 1 year, as it was done previously. Those born prior to 1 January 1994 and were yet to complete their military service were given an option to serve in a non-combatant role for a duration of one year.

This policy was reversed in 2022, when president Tsai Ing-wen announced that conscription will revert back to 1 year from 2024, as relations with the PRC had deteriorated since at least 2016 when her party came into power.

All-out defense 

Since 2021 training for reserve formations has been increased with an emphasis placed on urban and asymmetric warfare. The training period for reservists has been increased to two weeks from 5-7 days. In 2022 reserves numbered 2.31 million. The 2022 Russian invasion of Ukraine increased support for and understanding from the public of the effectiveness of well trained and equipped reserves. In 2022 women were included in reserve training. Following the Russian invasion the Ministry of Defense raised the required national stockpile minimum for medication from two months to six months with a up to a years worth of stockpiles mandated for critical drugs.

The military runs combat training camps for high school students during school breaks.

Organization

Military branches and structure 
The following service commands are directly subordinate to the General Staff, headed by the Chief of the General Staff, which answers to the civilian command structure under the Minister of Defense and the ROC President:
 Republic of China Army (ROCA)
 Republic of China Navy (ROCN)
 Republic of China Marine Corps (ROCMC)
 Republic of China Air Force (ROCAF)
 Republic of China Military Police (ROCMP)

The Coast Guard Administration was created in 2001 from related police and military units and is administered by the Executive Yuan and may be incorporated as a military branch during times of emergency but for the large part remains in civilian control.

There are also Combined Service Forces within the Republic of China military (army, navy, air force) such as Political Warfare Forces, Signaller, Combat medic, administrative, finance etc. The position of Deputy Commander-in-Chief of the Combined Service Forces exists in the Republic of China military. The last known person to hold this position was Muslim Lt. Gen. Ma Ching-chiang.

Arms purchases and weapons development

Arms purchases 

Acquisitions over the next several years will emphasize modern C 4 ISR equipment that will vastly improve communications and data-sharing among services. These and other planned acquisitions will gradually shift the island's strategic emphasis to offshore engagement of invading PRC forces. It is hoped that this will serve to reduce civilian casualties and damage to infrastructure in the event of armed conflict.

The ROC's armed forces are equipped with weapons obtained primarily from the United States, France, United Kingdom and the Netherlands.

In July 2007 it was reported that the ROC Army would request the purchase of 30 AH-64D II Apache attack helicopters based on the 2008 defense budget. The United Daily News reported that as many as 90 UH-60 Black Hawk helicopters would also be ordered to replace the UH-1Hs then in service.

During August, the ROC requested 60 AGM-84L Harpoon Block II missiles, 2 Harpoon guidance control units, 30 Harpoon containers, 30 Harpoon extended air-launch lugs, 50 Harpoon upgrade kits from AGM-84G to AGM-84L configuration and other related elements of logistics and program support, to a total value of US$125 million. The United States government indicated its approval of the order with notification to the United States Congress of the potential sale.

In mid-September 2007, the Pentagon notified the U.S. Congress of P-3C Orion order, which included 12 Orions and three "spare aircraft", along with an order for 144 SM-2 Block IIIA missiles. The total value of the 12 P-3C Orions were estimated at around $1.96 billion and $272 million for the 144 SM-2 missiles. A contract was awarded to Lockheed Martin to refurbish the 12 P-3C Orion aircraft for the ROC on 2009-03-13, with deliveries to start in 2012.

In mid-November 2007, the Pentagon notified the US Congress about a possible sale to upgrade the ROC's existing 3 Patriot missile batteries to the PAC-3 standard. The total value of the upgrade could be as much as $939 million.

The US government announced on 3 October that it planned to sell $6.5 billion worth of arms to the ROC ending the freeze of arms sales to the ROC. The plans include $2.5 billion worth of 30 AH-64D Block III Apache Longbow attack helicopters with night-vision sensors, radar, 174 Stinger Block I air-to-air missiles, 1,000 AGM-114L Hellfire missiles, PAC-3 missiles (330), 4 missile battery, radar sets, ground stations and other equipment valued up to $3.1 billion. 4 E-2T aircraft upgrade to E-2C Hawkeye 2000 was also included, worth up to $250 million. $200 million worth of submarine-launched Harpoon Block II missiles (32) would also be available for sale, $334 million worth of various aircraft spare parts and 182 Javelin missiles, with 20 Javelin command launchers.

However, not included in the arms sale were new F-16 C/D fighters, the feasibility study for diesel-electric submarines or UH-60 Black Hawk helicopters. The White House had declined to sell 66 F-16C/D fighter planes as US Pacific Command has felt no need for advanced arms to be sold to the ROC.

On 29 January 2010 the US government announced five notifications to US Congress for arms sales to the ROC, two Osprey class mine hunters for $105 million (all figures in US dollars), 25 Link 16 terminals on ships for $340 million, two ship- and two air-launched Harpoon L/II for $37 million, 60 UH-60M and other related items for $3.1 billion and three PAC-3 batteries with 26 launchers and 114 PAC-3 missiles for $2.81 billion, for a total $6.392 billion overall.

The ROC's efforts at arms purchases have consistently been opposed by the PRC.

Local Weapons Development 

The military's light weapons are generally managed by the Armaments Bureau of the Ministry of National Defense, whose 205th Arsenal (第205廠) is responsible for developing and producing light weapons such as T65 assault rifle, T75 Light machine gun, T86 assault rifle, T91 assault rifle, T75 pistol, various types of bullets etc.

The military has also stressed military "self-reliance," which has led to the growth of indigenous military production, producing items such as the ROC's Indigenous Defense Fighter, the Thunderbolt 2000 Multiple Launch Rocket System, Clouded Leopard Armoured Vehicle, the Sky Bow II and Sky Bow III SAMs and Hsiung Feng series of anti-ship missiles.

Reforms and development

Civilian control of the military

The modern day ROC military is styled after western military systems, mostly the US military. Internally, it has a political warfare branch/department that tightly controls and monitors each level of the ROC military, and reports directly to the General Headquarters of the ROC military, and if necessary, directly to the President of the ROC. This is a carryover from the pre-1949 era, when KMT and its army were penetrated by Communist agents repeatedly and led to frontline units defecting to Communist China. To strengthen their control over the military and prevent massive defection after retreating to Taiwan in 1949, CKS and CCK employed tight control over the military, by installing political officers and commissioners down to the company level, in order to ensure political correctness in the military and loyalty toward ROC leadership. This gave the political officers/commissars a great deal of power, allowing them to overrule the unit commander and take over the unit. Only in recent years has the political warfare department (due to cutbacks) reduced its power within the ROC military.

Two defense reform laws implemented in 2002 granted the civilian defense minister control over the entire military, and expanded legislative oversight authority for the first time in history. In the past the ROC military was closely linked with and controlled by the KMT (Nationalist Party). Following the democratization of the 1990s the military moved to a politically neutral position, though the senior officer ranks remained dominated by KMT members in 2001.

Doctrine and exercises

The primary goal of the ROC Armed Forces is to provide a credible deterrent against hostile action by establishing effective counterstrike and defense capabilities. ROC military doctrine in 2004 centered upon the principle of "offshore engagement" where the primary goal of the armed forces in any conflict with the PRC would be to keep as much of the fighting away from Taiwan proper for as long as possible to minimize damage to infrastructure and civilian casualties. As of 2004 the military had also begun to take the threat of a sudden "decapitation attack" by the PRC seriously. Consequently, there was growing emphasis on the role of the Navy and Air Force (where the Army had traditionally dominated); as well as the development of rapid reaction forces and quick mobilization of local reserve forces.

As of 2021 training for electronic warfare had been emphasized with significant offensive and defensive capabilities having been fielded.

The Han Kuang Exercise is the annual military exercise of the Republic of China Armed Forces for combat readiness in the event of an attack by the People's Liberation Army.

Strategy
China has removed the phrase "peaceful" in official government documents regarding plans to take back Taiwan.  Though the Army had previously been the dominant service, the shift to a defensive orientation has shifted importance to the Navy and Air Force to conduct most fighting away from population centers.  Given the current budgetary and numerical superiority of the Chinese military, Taiwan has moved towards an asymmetric anti-access/area denial system to imperil China's ability to operate in the Taiwan Strait rather than try to match its strength.  The RoCN, which was once the most neglected force, has become the most important to defeat an invasion fleet.  Combating the enemy fleet and sinking transport ships would take out large amounts of the ground invasion force and permanently degrade amphibious capabilities.  Surface ships primarily consist of guided missile destroyers and frigates, as well as four dozen small, fast missile boats to take out much larger Chinese surface and amphibious ships.  The RoCAF is optimized for air superiority and was once the more formidable of the two countries, but current Chinese technology investments have made China much more able to contest airspace.  Air bases are likely to come under attack from Chinese conventional ballistic missiles in range of the island. Taiwan has equipment to keep exposed bases operating while under fire with runway repair systems and mobile aircraft arresting systems.  There are two underground air bases used by the RoCAF: Chiashan Air Force Base which is in a hollowed-out mountain that can protect 200 fighters and Chihhang Air Base which can protect 80 aircraft. The RoCAF operates a nationwide air defense network to engage targets anywhere over the mainland; some anti-aircraft missile batteries are also located in underground silos.  The Army would only fight if Chinese forces manage to land and would engage in asymmetric warfare.  In 2014 Taiwan Minister of National Defense Yen Ming believed that the country would be able to hold off a Chinese invasion for at least one month. 

In the late 2010s Taiwan's military adopted a new strategy called the Overall Defense Concept (ODC), according to The Diplomat "In short, the ODC is a holistically integrated strategy for guiding Taiwan's military force development and joint operations, emphasizing Taiwan's existing natural advantages, civilian infrastructure and asymmetrical warfare capabilities. It is designed to deter and, if necessary, defeat an invasion by China's People's Liberation Army (PLA)." In 2021 Defense Minister Chiu Kuo-cheng said that “I always tell my peers to stop asking, ‘how many days we need to hold out?’ The question is, ‘how many days does China want to fight?’ We’ll keep them company for as many days as they want to fight.” The adopted ODC emphasizes deep strike and layered deterrence.

Foreign cooperation

Taiwan has engaged in training with foreign forces, primarily American and British, for a long time but cooperation was stepped up after the passage of the Taiwan Travel Act in 2018. Exchanges between high ranking Taiwanese officers and their NATO counterparts have also been on the rise. This cooperation includes both military and academic exchanges such as those with the NATO School and the NATO Defense College.

El Salvador
In the 1970s the Republic of China trained Salvadoran officers involved in human rights violations during the country's civil war.

European Union
In 2011 and 2012 Taiwan worked with the EU's Naval Force in Operation Atalanta to counter piracy off the coast of Somalia. Since then exchanges and information sharing has continued, between 2011 and 2015 EU anti-piracy officials made five visits to Taiwan.

Eswatini
In 2020, Taiwan donated two UH-1H utility helicopters to Eswatini.

Guatemala
In the 1970s the Republic of China trained Guatemalan officers involved in human rights violations. In 2019 Guatemalan Minister of Defense Major General Luis Miguel Ralda Moreno visited Taiwan and met with Taiwanese President Tsai Ing-wen.

Honduras
In 2015 Taiwan donated three UH-1H utility helicopters to Honduras.

Japan
There is no official cooperation between the ROC military and the Japanese Self Defense Force (JSDF). The JSDF has sent observers to the digital part of the annual Han Kuang Exercise.
New Japanese military legislation came into effect in 2016, allowing deployment to defend a regional ally under attack. This is thought to be primarily legislation for Japan to deploy to Taiwan in an event of an attack on Taiwan, which in turn threatens Japanese security in its southern islands.

Nicaragua
In 2019 Taiwan donated five refurbished surplus interceptor boats to the Nicaraguan Armed Forces. The transfer ceremony occurred at the naval forces’ 2nd battalion in Puerto Sandino.

Paraguay
In 2019 Taiwan donated two UH-1H helicopters and 30 Humvees to the Armed Forces of Paraguay. Paraguayan President Mario Abdo Benítez shared pictures of the military aid on the presidential Twitter feed.

Singapore

Starting in 1975, Singapore has sent units from its military to train in the Republic of China under the Starlight training program. Singaporean forces training in Taiwan numbered roughly 3,000 as of 2005. Singapore has also supplied the ROCAF with military equipment.

In 2007, a F-5F fighter operated by the Republic of China Air Force (ROCAF) crashed into base housing that was occupied by Singaporean personnel, killing the pilots. Two Singaporeans on the ground were also killed, with nine injured. The Starlight program at that time numbered around 7,000 personnel.

In 2019, a Singaporean paratrooper was seriously injured during nighttime parachute training. He underwent intensive surgery and recovery in Taiwan. In 2020 he was flown back to Singapore aboard a Singapore Air Force A330 Multi-Role Tanker Transport.

United States

Collaboration between the ROC and US militaries began during World War II when both nations were members of the Allied forces, and continued through the Chinese Civil War when ROC forces were supplied primarily by the US until the final evacuation of ROC forces to Taiwan in 1949. Initially the U.S. expected the ROC government to fall and withdrew support until the outbreak of the Korean War when the U.S. 7th Fleet was ordered to the Taiwan Straits both to protect Taiwan from a PRC attack, and to stop ROC actions against the PRC. A formal US-ROC security pact was signed in 1954 establishing a formal alliance that lasted until US recognition of the PRC in 1979. During this period US military advisers were deployed to the ROC and joint exercises were common. The United States Taiwan Defense Command was established in the Philippines for reinforcement of Taiwan airspace. The US and ROC also collaborated on human and electronic intelligence operations directed against the PRC.

ROC units participated in the Korean War and the Vietnam War in non-combat capacities, primarily at the insistence of the United States which was concerned that the high-profile roles for ROC forces in these conflicts would lead to full scale PRC intervention. The United States deployed nuclear weapons on Taiwan as part of the United States Taiwan Defense Command. Nuclear weapons are known to have been stored at Tainan Air Force Base until their withdrawal was ordered by the American President in 1972. High-level cooperation ended with the US recognition of the PRC in 1979, when all remaining US forces in Taiwan were withdrawn. The US continued to supply the ROC with arms sales per the Taiwan Relations Act, albeit in a diminished role.

When the United States Congress enacted on September 30, 2002, the Foreign Relations Authorization Act for FY 2003, it required that Taiwan be "treated as though it were designated a major non-NATO ally."  Despite some initial misgivings about Congress's perceived intrusion into the President's foreign affairs authority, the Bush administration subsequently submitted a letter to Congress on August 29, 2003, designating Taiwan as a major non-NATO ally.

In recent years, the ROC military has again begun higher level cooperation with the U.S. Military after over two decades of relative isolation. Senior officers from the U.S. Pacific Command observed the annual Han Kuang military exercises in 2005. The US also upgraded its military liaison position in Taipei from a position held by retired officers hired on a contractual basis to one held by an active duty officer the same year. The United States regularly sends personnel to Taiwan for both training and liaison purposes but does so either secretly or in an unofficial capacity. ROC Marines have trained with their American counterparts in Hawaii and US Marines have also deployed to Taiwan.

In 2015 two United States Marine Corps F/A-18C Hornets made an unscheduled landing at Tainan Air Force Base after one of them developed an engine anomaly in-flight. The aircraft were accommodated in an air force hangar until a C-130 full of American technicians could be flown in to check them out. 

Tsai Ing-wen's request of purchasing weaponry from the US was approved by the US State Department in July 2019. The deal includes 108 Abrams tanks, 250 Stinger missiles and related equipment worth $2.2 billion. Tsai said the weaponry would "greatly enhance our land and air capabilities, strengthen military morale and show to the world the US commitment to Taiwan's defense." In May 2020, the U.S. Department of State approved a Foreign Military Sale of 18 MK-48 Mod 6 Advanced Technology Heavy Weight Torpedoes for Taiwan in a deal estimated to cost $180 million.

Elite units of the ROC and American militaries have trained together for a long time, units often have particular relationships for example the MPSSC trains and engages in exercises with United States Army Special Forces. In June 2020 the United States Army Special Forces published a promotional video which included footage of Green Berets training in Taiwan. The ROC Army Aviation and Special Forces Command and the United States Army Special Forces have an annual training exercise called Balance Tamper. The ROC Marines receive training annually from the US Marine Corps’ Marine Raider Regiment. The United States Air Force supports Taiwan's air force through air-to-air refueling and training.

Military parades

The Republic of China held their first military parade on 10 October 2007 for National Day celebrations since 1991. Previous parades were halted in an effort to ease the tension with the PRC. The parade was aimed at easing worries that the armed forces might be unprepared for a conflict with the PRC. The parade consisted of indigenous missiles, U.S. Patriot II and Avenger anti-missiles systems, U.S.-made F-16s, French-made Mirages and Taiwan-made IDF fighters.

In 2015, another parade was held to mark the 70th anniversary of the defeat of Japan in 1945 in northern Hsinchu county. The parade was long at two hours and consisted of indigenous missiles, Apache helicopters and awards for World War II veterans.

Military ranks

Major deployments, battles and incidents

1912–1949

 Northern Expedition: 1926–1928
Central Plains War: May 1930 – 4 November 1930
 First Communist Insurrection/Purge: 1927–1937
Nanchang Uprising: 1927
Autumn Harvest Uprising: 1927
Xi'an Incident: 12 December 1936
 Second Sino-Japanese War/World War II: 1937–1945
Marco Polo Bridge Incident: 7 July 1937
Battle of Shanghai: 13 August – 9 November 1937
Battle of Nanjing: October–December 1937
Battle of Taierzhuang: 24 March – April 1938
First Battle of Changsha: 17 September – 6 October 1939
Second Battle of Changsha: 6 September – 8 October 1941
Third Battle of Changsha: 24 December 1941 – 15 January 1942
Defense of Sichuan: 1942–1943
Battle of Hengyang-Changsha: June 1944 – April 1945
 Chinese Civil War: 1946–1950
 New Fourth Army Incident: 1940
 February 28 Incident: 28 February – March 1947

Since 1949

 Battle of Kuningtou: 25–28 October 1949
 Battle of Dengbu Island: 3–5 November 1949
 Hainan Campaign: 1 March 1950 – 1 May 1950
 First Battle of Dadan island: July 26, 1950
 Korean War: 1950–1953, Translators, cross border raids into southwest China from Burma.
 Battle of Nanri island: 11 – 15 April 1952
 Dongshan Island Campaign: 15 July 1953
 First Taiwan Strait Crisis: August 1954 – May 1955
Battle of Yijiangshan: 18 January 1955
Tachen Evacuation: 7–11 February 1955
 Second Taiwan Strait Crisis (August 23 Artillery Battle): 23 August – early October 1958
 Second Battle of Dadan island: 26 August 1958
 Vietnam War: 1960s, Deployment of small groups of ROC troops disguised as locals, transportation, and technical assistance. Not widely publicized to avoid PRC involvement.
 Battle of Dong-Yin: 1 May 1965
 Battle of Wuchow: 13–14 November 1965
 Yemen Civil War: 1979 to 1985: 80+ F-5E pilots plus ground crew sent to North Yemen to boost its air defense at the request of Saudi Arabia and the United States. At least one squadron strength was kept throughout the period, flying North Yemen's F-5E fleet.
 Third Taiwan Strait Crisis: 21 July 1995 – 23 March 1996
 Southeast Asian tsunami relief: January 2005
 Military intervention against ISIL: 13 June 2014 – present (Under CJTF-OIR)

Nuclear weapons program

The development of nuclear weapons by the ROC has been a contentious issue. The U.S., hoping to avoid escalating tensions in the Taiwan Strait, has continually opposed arming the ROC with nuclear weapons. Accordingly, the ROC, although not a member of the United Nations, adheres to the principles of the nuclear Non-Proliferation Treaty and has stated that it does not intend to produce nuclear weapons. Past nuclear research by the ROC makes it a 'threshold' nuclear state.

In 1967, a nuclear weapons program began under the auspices of the Institute of Nuclear Energy Research (INER) at the Chungshan Institute of Science and Technology. The ROC was able to acquire nuclear technology from abroad (including a research reactor from Canada and low-grade plutonium from the United States) allegedly for a civilian energy system, but in actuality to develop fuel for nuclear weapons.

After the International Atomic Energy Agency found evidence of the ROC's efforts to produce weapons-grade plutonium, Taipei agreed in September 1976 under U.S. pressure to dismantle its nuclear weapons program. The nuclear reactor was soon shut down and the plutonium mostly returned to the U.S.

Another secret program was revealed after 1987 Lieyu massacre, when Colonel Chang Hsien-yi, deputy director of Nuclear Research at INER who was secretly working for the CIA, defected to the U.S. in December, and produced a cache of incriminating documents. In 1988 upon being questioned by Director of American Institute in Taiwan, David Dean in person with the United States satellite image recording a minimized nuclear test at Jioupeng military base field in Pingtung in 1986, Superior-general Hau Pei-tsun claimed that scientists in Taiwan had already produced the controlled nuclear reaction as the continuous progress in decades after the previous accomplishment equivalent to 1/6 of Hiroshima scale in South Africa in 1980, as per General Hau's Diary and President Nelson Mandela's later findings. Under pressure from the U.S., the program was halted.

During the 1995–1996 Taiwan Strait crisis, ROC President Lee Teng-hui proposed to reactivate the program, but was forced to back down a few days later after drawing intense criticism from the U.S. government.

With the unbalanced military equation across the Taiwan Strait, Taipei may choose nuclear weapons as a deterrent against the military encirclement by the People's Republic of China.

Budget

Taiwan's budget figures exclude both the classified budget and special funds allocated by the Executive Yuan. As of 2020 special funds expenditures were almost 2 billion a year. In 2021 the legislature approved a US$9 billion special budget for weapons and systems procurement.

See also 
 Republic of China Armed Forces Museum
 People's Liberation Army
 Grey-zone (international relations)
 Republic of China Navy
 Republic of China Marine Corps
 Amphibious Reconnaissance and Patrol Unit
 Republic of China Army
 Airborne Special Service Company
 Republic of China Air Force
 Republic of China Military Police
 Republic of China Armed Forces Reserve

Notes

References

Citations

Sources

External links 

 ROC Ministry of National Defense Official Website 

Military of the Republic of China
1924 establishments in China
Military units and formations established in 1947